Sofía, Queen of Spain, has received numerous titles, decorations, and honorary appointments, both during and before her time as consort to King Juan Carlos. Each is listed below. Where two dates are shown, the first indicates the date of receiving the award or title and the second indicates the date of its loss, renunciation or when its use was discontinued.

Honours

National honours
  Greek Royal Family: 
 Dame Grand Cross of the Order of Saints Olga and Sophia
 Recipient of the Commemorative Badge of the Centenary of the Royal House of Greece
 :
 Dame Grand Cross with Collar of the Order of Charles III
 11th Former Grand Mistress and 1,193rd Dame of the Order of Queen Maria Luisa
 Recipient of the Spanish Red Cross Medal

Foreign honours
 :
 Grand Cross of the Order of the Liberator General San Martín
 :
 Grand Star of the Decoration of Honour for Services to the Republic of Austria
 :
 Grand Cordon of the Order of Leopold
 :
 Grand Cross of the Order of the Southern Cross
 :
 Grand Cross of the Order of Merit
 :
 Grand Cross Extraordinary of the Order of Boyacá
 Grand Cross of the Order of San Carlos
 :
 Grand Cross of the Order of Juan Mora Fernández
 :
 Knight of the Order of the Elephant
 :
 Grand Cross with Gold Breast Star of the Order of Merit of Duarte, Sánchez and Mella
 :
 Grand Cross of the National Order of San Lorenzo
 :
 Grand Cross Supreme Class of the Order of the Virtues
 :
 Grand Cross with Silver Star of the Order of José Matías Delgado
 :
 Grand Cross of the Order of the Cross of Terra Mariana
  Ethiopian Imperial Family:
 Dame Grand Cordon with Collar of the Order of the Queen of Sheba
 :
 Grand Cross with Collar of the Order of the White Rose of Finland
 :
 Grand Cross of the Order of the Legion of Honour
 Grand Cross of the Order of the National Merit
 :
 Grand Cross Special Class of the Order of Merit of the Federal Republic of Germany
 :
 Grand Cross of the Order of the Redeemer
 :
 Grand Cross of the Order of the Quetzal
 :
 Dame Grand Cross with Collar of the Order of the Holy Sepulchre
 Recipient of the For Church and Pope Badge Medal
 Recipient of the Benemerenti Medal
 :
 Grand Cross of the Order of Francisco Morazán
 :
 Grand Cross of the Order of Merit of the Republic of Hungary
 :
 Grand Cross of the Order of the Falcon
 :
 1st Class of the Star of Mahaputera
  Iranian Imperial Family:
 Member 1st Class of the Order of the Pleiades
 Recipient of the Commemorative Medal of the 2,500 year Celebration of the Persian Empire
 :
 Knight Grand Cross of the Order of Merit of the Italian Republic
  Calabrian Royal Family of Two Sicilies:
 Dame Grand Cross of Justice of the Two Sicilian Sacred Military Constantinian Order of Saint George
 :
 Honorary Member of the Order of Jamaica
 :
 Grand Cordon (Paulownia) of the Order of the Precious Crown
 :
 Grand Cordon Special Class of the Supreme Order of the Renaissance
 Grand Cordon 2nd Class of the Order of the Star of Jordan
 :
 Grand Cross with Collar of the Order of the Three Stars
 :
 Grand Cross of the Order of Merit
 :
 Grand Cross of the Order of Vytautas the Great
 :
 Knight of the Order of the Gold Lion of the House of Nassau
 :
 Honorary Member of the Xirka Ġieħ ir-Repubblika
 :
 Sash of Special Category of the Order of the Aztec Eagle
 :
 Member Special Class of the Order of Muhammad
  Nepalese Royal Family:
 Member of the Order of the Benevolent Ruler
 :
 Knight Grand Cross of the Order of the Netherlands Lion
 Recipient of the Wedding Medal of Princess Beatrix, Princess of Orange and Claus Van Amsberg
 :
 Grand Cross of the Order of the Niger
 :
 Grand Cross of the Order of St. Olav
 :
 Grand Cross Extraordinary of the Order of Vasco Núñez de Balboa
 :
 Grand Cross of the Order of the Sun of Peru
 :
 Member of the Order of Gabriela Silang
 Grand Collar of the Order of the Golden Heart
 :
 Knight of the Order of the White Eagle
 : 
 Grand Cross of the Order of Christ
 Grand Cross of the Military Order of Saint James of the Sword
 Grand Cross of the Order of Prince Henry
 :
 Grand Cross of the Order of the Star of Romania
 :
 Grand Cross of the Order of the White Double Cross
 :
 Grand Cross of the Order of Good Hope
 :
 Member of the Grand Order of Mugunghwa
 : 
 Member of the Royal Order of the Seraphim
 Recipient of the 50th Birthday Badge Medal of King Carl XVI Gustaf
 :
 Dame of the Order of the Royal House of Chakri
 Dame Grand Cross with Chain of the Order of Chula Chom Klao
 
  Medal of the Oriental Republic of Uruguay (1996)
  :
 Grand Cross of the Order of the Liberator
 :
 Grand Cross of the National Order of the Leopard

Honorific eponyms

Córdoba: Hospital Universitario Reina Sofía (University Hospital Queen Sofia)
Murcia: Hospital Reina Sofía (Hospital Queen Sofia)
Granada: Conservatorio Profesional de Danza Reina Sofía
Tudela: Hospital Reina Sofia (Hospital Queen Sofia)
Madrid: Museo Nacional Centro de Arte Reina Sofía (Queen Sofia National Museum and Art Center)
Madrid: Escuela Superior de Música Reina Sofía (Queen Sofía College of Music)
Tenerife: Tenerife South–Queen Sofía Airport
Spanish frigate Queen Sofía (F84)

Manila: Queen Sofia Hall – National Museum of Fine Arts

New York City: Queen Sofía Spanish Institute
 Antarctica
South Shetland Islands: Mount Reina Sofía (Mount Queen Sofía) on Livingston Island

Other honours

 Fundación Reina Sofía (Queen Sofía's Foundation):  President (1977 – Present)
 Fundación de Ayuda contra la Drogadicción (Spanish Foundation of Aid against Drug Addiction):  Honorary President (1986–2015).
Real Patronato sobre Discapacidad (Spanish Royal Board on Disability):  Honorary President (1986–2015).

Scholastic 
Queen Sofía has been the recipient of numerous honorary doctorates including:

University of Valladolid

Rosario University

Tokyo: University of Seinen 

University of Évora

University of Cambridge
University of Oxford

Georgetown University
Downtown San Antonio, Texas: St. Mary's University
State University of New York

Spanish Royal Academies 
 Real Academia de Bellas Artes de San Fernando (Royal Academy of Fine Arts of St. Ferdinand): Honorary Member
 Real Academia de la Historia (Royal Academy of History): Honorary Member

See also
 Queen Sofía of Spain
 List of titles and honours of Juan Carlos I of Spain
 List of titles and honours of Felipe VI of Spain
 List of titles and honours of Queen Letizia of Spain
 List of honours of the Spanish Royal Family by country
 List of titles and honours of the Spanish Crown

References
   HM The Queen, Official site of the Royal Household of Spain.

Lists of titles by person of Spain
Spanish monarchy
Lists of Spanish monarchs

Grand Collars of the Order of the Golden Heart
Grand Commanders of the Order of the Niger
Grand Cordons of the Order of Merit (Lebanon)
Grand Cordons of the Order of the Precious Crown
Grand Croix of the Légion d'honneur
Dames Grand Cross of the Order of Chula Chom Klao
Knights Grand Cross of the Order of Merit of the Italian Republic
Knights Grand Cross of the Order of the Falcon
Grand Crosses of the Order of Christ (Portugal)
Grand Crosses of the Order of the Liberator General San Martin
Grand Crosses of the Order of Merit of the Republic of Hungary (civil)
Grand Crosses of the Order of Prince Henry
Grand Crosses of the Order of the Quetzal
Grand Crosses of the Order of Saint James of the Sword
Grand Crosses of the Order of the Star of Romania
Grand Crosses of the Order of Vytautas the Great
Recipients of the Order of the Cross of Terra Mariana, 1st Class
Recipients of the Grand Star of the Decoration for Services to the Republic of Austria
Grand Crosses of the Order of José Matías Delgado
Grand Crosses of the Order of the Sun of Peru
Order of Merit of Duarte, Sánchez and Mella
Members of the Order of Jamaica
Recipients of the Order of the White Eagle (Poland)
Recipients of orders, decorations, and medals of Ethiopia